Frank Holder may refer to:

 Frank Holder (musician) (1925–2017), Guyanese jazz singer and percussionist
 Frank Holder (artist), American artist, sculptor, and choreographer